A Spectral risk measure is a risk measure given as a weighted average of outcomes where bad outcomes are, typically, included with larger weights. A spectral risk measure is a function of portfolio returns and outputs the amount of the numeraire (typically a currency) to be kept in reserve.  A spectral risk measure is always a coherent risk measure, but the converse does not always hold.  An advantage of spectral measures is the way in which they can be related to risk aversion, and particularly to a utility function, through the weights given to the possible portfolio returns.

Definition 

Consider a portfolio  (denoting the portfolio payoff).  Then a spectral risk measure  where  is non-negative, non-increasing, right-continuous, integrable function defined on  such that  is defined by

where  is the cumulative distribution function for X.

If there are  equiprobable outcomes with the corresponding payoffs given by the order statistics . Let . The measure

 Nonnegativity:  for all ,
 Normalization: ,

Properties
Spectral risk measures are also coherent.  Every spectral risk measure  satisfies:
 Positive Homogeneity: for every portfolio X and positive value , ;
 Monotonicity: for all portfolios X and Y such that , ;
 Sub-additivity: for all portfolios X and Y, ; 
 Law-Invariance: for all portfolios X and Y with cumulative distribution functions  and  respectively, if  then ;
 Comonotonic Additivity: for every comonotonic random variables X and Y, .  Note that X and Y are comonotonic if for every .
In some texts the input X is interpreted as losses rather than payoff of a portfolio.

Examples 
 The expected shortfall is a spectral measure of risk.
 The expected value is trivially a spectral measure of risk.

See also 
 Distortion risk measure

References 

Financial risk modeling